A list of films produced in South Korea in 1993:

External links
1993 in South Korea

 1993-1995 at www.koreanfilm.org

1993
South Korean
1993 in South Korea